Brent Freeman is a serial entrepreneur who's passionate about using business to generate both financial returns and social impact at the same time. He is an American digital entrepreneur, startup advisor, contributor at Entrepreneur.com and INC.com, Entrepreneur in Residence at early stage venture capital firm Crosscut Ventures in Los Angeles, and Founder / President of Stealth Venture Labs. While still an undergraduate at the University of Southern California, Brent launched a commodities trading firm with offices in Dubai and Los Angeles.

In 2009, Brent founded Roozt.com (pronounced “roo-st”) with a vision of connecting the millennial shopper with fashion forward, socially conscious brands in an online marketplace setting. Roozt researched and rated each brand's socially conscious business practices and then marketed the brands to online shoppers. As one of the pioneering advertisers on Facebook, Roozt grew into an industry leading, seven-figure revenue generating platform with a community of over 250k people that donated a meal to Americans in need for every member who joined. Roozt was a Forbes Name You Need to Know in 2011 and featured in Mashable, Huffington Post, PandoDaily, NBC, ABC, and the Today Show. In 2012, for his work at Roozt, Brent was featured by the Los Angeles Business Journal as a “Top 20 in Their 20’s” for the Greater Los Angeles area.

After Roozt, Brent became an Entrepreneur In Residence at Los Angeles based VC fund Crosscut Ventures, where he helped vet & source consumer internet deals as well as advise their portfolio companies on digital marketing. Brent has been a public speaker all over the country on topics like social impact, social entrepreneurship and general startup life, including a TEDx on social enterprise, and has contributed to Entrepreneur and INC as an author on similar topics.

In 2014, Brent founded Stealth Venture Labs with the vision of creating a turnkey, world-class digital marketing team-for-hire that could help incubate and accelerate ecommerce brands in a quicker and more cost-effective manner than they ever could do themselves.

In 2018, Brent and his team launched the SVL Micro Fund that is a non-profit lending arm that will provide $1,000 - $10,000 startup loans to “unlendable” young entrepreneurs in the US from disadvantaged backgrounds. Based on the Grameen Bank's “accountability, mutual trust, creativity and participation” underwriting model, these micro loans are aimed at helping young, low-income break the cycle of poverty using entrepreneurship as their vehicle.

In 2020, Brent was nominated and confirmed to be knighted by the Italian Royal Family House of Savoy as a Cavaliere (Knight) for his dedicated career in social enterprise using for profit businesses to create social impact.

Brent was born in San Francisco, CA, Brent grew up in Marin County and went to Redwood High School where he graduated in the top of his class.

References

1985 births
Living people
University of Southern California alumni
Businesspeople from San Francisco
Redwood High School (Larkspur, California) alumni